2 Chronicles 4 is the fourth chapter of the Second Book of Chronicles the Old Testament of the Christian Bible or of the second part of the Books of Chronicles in the Hebrew Bible. The book is compiled from older sources by an unknown person or group, designated by modern scholars as "the Chronicler", and had the final shape established in late fifth or fourth century BCE. This chapter belongs to the section focusing on the kingship of Solomon (2 Chronicles 1 to 9). The focus of this chapter is the construction of the temple's interior decoration.

Text
This chapter was originally written in the Hebrew language and is divided into 22 verses.

Textual witnesses
Some early manuscripts containing the text of this chapter in Hebrew are of the Masoretic Text, which includes the Aleppo Codex (10th century) and Codex Leningradensis (1008.

There is also a translation into Koine Greek known as the Septuagint, made in the last few centuries BCE. Extant ancient manuscripts of the Septuagint version include Codex Vaticanus (B; B; 4th century), and Codex Alexandrinus (A; A; 5th century).

Old Testament references
: 
: 
: 
:

The bronze altar and molten sea (4:1–5)
This section records the construction of the bronze altar (verse 1; cf. 1 Kings 8:64; 2 Kings 16:14–15; 2 Chronicles 1:5; Ezekiel 43:13–17) and the molten sea (verses 2–5; cf. 1 Kings 7:23–26). The altar was a formidable object, probably made of wood and covered with bronze, with the measures probably referring to the base.

Verse 1
Then he made a bronze altar that was twenty cubits long, twenty cubits wide, and ten cubits high.

Verse 2

Also he made a molten sea of ten cubits from brim to brim, round in compass, and five cubits the height thereof; and a line of thirty cubits did compass it round about.
Cross reference: 1 Kings 7:23
 "5 cubits": a length measurement of about 7½ feet or 2.3 meters.
 "30 cubits": about 45 feet or 14 meters.
The approximation of the mathematical constant "" ("pi"), defined as the ratio of a circle's circumference to its diameter, can apparently be calculated from this verse as 30 cubits divided by 10 cubits to yield "3". Using gematria, qaweh yields "111" whereas qaw yields "106", so when used in calculation  it results in  =  "3.1415094", very close to the modern definition of "3.1415926".

Verse 5
And the thickness of it was an handbreadth, and the brim of it like the work of the brim of a cup, with flowers of lilies; and it received and held three thousand baths.
 "Handbreadth": a measurement of length of about 3 inches or 7.5 centimeters.
 "Bath"": a measurement of volume of about 6 gallons or 22 liters, so "3000 baths" would have been about 18,000 gallons, or 66,000 liters.

The temple's interior (4:6–22)
Verse 10–22 closely parallel 1 Kings 7:39–50 except for the omission of materials in 1 Kings 7:27–37. 
1 Kings 7:38 corresponds to 2 Chronicles 4:6, while 1 Kings 7:38–39a is reworked at 2 Chronicles 4:6a, but verses 6b–9 have no parallel in Kings, and 1 Kings 7:39b—51 corresponds to 2 Chronicles 4:10-5:1. The (lengthy) passage in Kings concerning the stands for the basins is only found in verse 14. The function of the basin (verse 6) is related to Exodus 30:17-21, where a copper basin is used for ceremonial washing. The list of golden materials in verses 7–9 corresponds to that in 1 Kings 7:48–50 (cf. verses 19–22), presented in the order of the Chronicler's (original) list in 1 Chronicles 28:15–18. Whereas the tabernacle was equipped with only one lampstand (Exodus 25:31–40; 31:8; Leviticus 24:1–4; Numbers 8:2–4), an interesting similarity to 13:11, there were ten in the Temple (verse 7; cf. multiple lampstands in 1 Chronicles 28:15; 2 Chronicles 4:20; 1 Kings 7:49). Both the tabernacle (Exodus 25:23-30; 26:35; Leviticus 24:5–9; 2 Chronicles 13:11) and Solomon's temple according to 1 Kings 7:48 only mention one shewbread table, but there were ten in verse 8, and by contrast to the one, the ten tables in the Chronicles (1 Chronicles 28:16) are not explicitly characterized as covered in gold. Whereas 1 Kings 6:36 only briefly mentions the inner courtyard, the Chronicler clearly distinguishes between the priests' court (1 Kings 6:36; 7:12) and the precinct for laymen.

Verse 17
 In the plain of Jordan did the king cast them, in the clay ground between Succoth and Zeredathah.
"Zĕrēdāthāh" means "towards Zĕrĕdāh" (1 Kings 11:26), so both names denote the same place. Succoth and Zeredah were located east of the Jordan River.

See also

Related Bible parts: Exodus 25, Exodus 26, Leviticus 24, Numbers 8, 1 Kings 6, 1 Kings 7, 1 Kings 8, 2 Kings 16, 1 Chronicles 28

Notes

References

Sources

External links
 Jewish translations:
 Divrei Hayamim II - II Chronicles - Chapter 4 (Judaica Press) in Hebrew and English translation [with Rashi's commentary] at Chabad.org
 Christian translations:
 Online Bible at GospelHall.org (ESV, KJV, Darby, American Standard Version, Bible in Basic English)
 2 Chronicles Chapter 4. Bible Gateway

04